Edward Lyons Gilligan (April 18, 1843 – April 2, 1922) was an American soldier who fought in the American Civil War. Gilligan received his country's highest award for bravery during combat, the Medal of Honor. Gilligan's medal was won after he assisted in the capture of a Confederate flag. He was honored with the award on April 30, 1892.

Gilligan joined the Army from Philadelphia in October 1861. He was commissioned as an officer in October 1864, and mustered out with his regiment in June 1865.  Gilligan was buried in Oxford, Pennsylvania.

Medal of Honor citation

See also
List of Medal of Honor recipients for the Battle of Gettysburg
List of American Civil War Medal of Honor recipients: G–L

References

1843 births
1922 deaths
19th-century American people
American Civil War recipients of the Medal of Honor
People of Pennsylvania in the American Civil War
Military personnel from Philadelphia
Union Army soldiers
United States Army Medal of Honor recipients